Shayne Stevenson (born October 26, 1970) is a Canadian former professional ice hockey centre.  He was drafted in the first round, 17th overall, by the Boston Bruins in the 1989 NHL Entry Draft.

Playing career

He appeared in nineteen National Hockey League games with the Bruins, scoring just one assist, before being selected by the Tampa Bay Lightning in the 1992 NHL Expansion Draft.  He appeared in eight games with the Lightning in 1992–93, scoring one assist.

He currently resides in Newmarket, Ontario.

Career statistics

Regular season and playoffs

Roller Hockey statistics

External links

1970 births
Atlanta Knights players
Ayr Scottish Eagles players
Boston Bruins draft picks
Boston Bruins players
Brantford Smoke players
Canadian ice hockey centres
Fort Wayne Komets players
Sportspeople from Aurora, Ontario
Kitchener Rangers players
Living people
London Knights players
Maine Mariners players
Manchester Storm (1995–2002) players
Muskegon Fury players
National Hockey League first-round draft picks
Port Huron Border Cats players
Saginaw Lumber Kings players
St. Thomas Wildcats players
San Angelo Outlaws players
Tampa Bay Lightning players
Utica Blizzard players
Ice hockey people from Ontario
Canadian expatriate ice hockey players in England
Canadian expatriate ice hockey players in Scotland
Canadian expatriate ice hockey players in Italy